The Colgate Raiders represented Colgate University in the 2010–11 NCAA Division I women's ice hockey season. The Raiders head coach was Scott Wiley. Assisting him were Ryan Stone,  Karine Senecal, and Karen Thatcher.

Offseason
May 26, 2010: 2010 Winter Olympian Karen Thatcher has been named an assistant coach

Exhibition

Regular season
Kimberley Sass recorded 27 saves in a 5-3 win over the Connecticut Huskies. With the win, she is 2-0 overall along with one shutout.
January 28: The Colgate women's hockey team raised $12,000 in autism research with its Autism Awareness Project. The Light Up Starr Rink Blue game against RPI on Friday, Jan. 28 attracted 1,038, all of whom were wearing light blue, the color of Autism Speaks. The team wore special puzzle-piece jerseys designed by OT Sports.
February 11: Kimberly Sass recorded 26 saves in a 1-0 shutout over the Yale Bulldogs. It was Sass' fifth shutout of the season and third straight at home, both of which are new school records. The game winning goal was scored by Brittany Phillips.

Standings

Schedule

Conference record

Awards and honors
Kimberly Sass, ECAC Defensive Player of the Week (Week of October 18, 2011)

Team awards
Shannon Doyle, Rookie of the Year
Meghan Wickens, Most Improved Player
Heidi Peterson, Sportsmanship Award
Brittany Phillips, Brad Houston Offensive MVP
Amanda Kirwan, Defensive MVP
Kimberly Sass, Marian Lefevre Coaches Award
Jessi Waters, Don Palmateer Award

References

External links
Official site

C
C
Colgate Raiders women's ice hockey seasons